Lehmann's Honeymoon (German: Lehmanns Brautfahrt) is a 1916 German silent comedy film directed by Robert Wiene and starring Guido Herzfeld, Christel Lorenz, and Arnold Rieck. In order to persuade a daydreaming Professor of Greek History to marry his cousin, his family dress themselves up as Ancient Greeks.

Cast
 Guido Herzfeld  
 Christel Lorenz   
 Arnold Rieck   
 Hella Thornegg

References

Bibliography
 Jung, Uli & Schatzberg, Walter. Beyond Caligari: The Films of Robert Wiene. Berghahn Books, 1999.

External links

1916 films
German silent feature films
German comedy films
Films of the German Empire
Films directed by Robert Wiene
1916 comedy films
German black-and-white films
Silent comedy films
1910s German films